The 2003 U.S. Bank Cleveland Grand Prix was the ninth round of 18 of the 2003 CART World Series season, held on July 5, 2003 at Burke Lakefront Airport in Cleveland, Ohio.  It was the first road course race to be held at night in CART history.

Qualifying results

Race

*Tiago Monteiro suffered a mild concussion after a pre-race practice crash and was not allowed to start by the CART medical officials.

Caution flags

Notes

 Average Speed 117.315 mph

External links
 Full Weekend Times & Results

Cleveland
2003
2003 in sports in Ohio